Abbé Joseph-Antoine Boullan (Saint-Porquier, Tarn-et-Garonne, 18 February 1824 – 4 January 1893, Lyon) was a French Roman Catholic priest who was later laicized, and was often accused of being a Satanist although he continued to defend his status as a Christian.

He was a friend and inspiration of the writer Joris-Karl Huysmans. Huysmans with Henri Antoine Jules-Bois supported Boullan in a celebrated occultist feud with the Marquis Stanislas de Guaita.

Boullan is mentioned in The Prague Cemetery, the novel by Umberto Eco.

References 

1824 births
1893 deaths
People from Tarn-et-Garonne
19th-century French Roman Catholic priests
Abbés
French Satanists
Laicized Roman Catholic priests